Zhengxiang District is an urban district of Hengyang City, Hunan province, China. The district is located in the west of the city proper, Zheng River flows from the west to the east. It is bordered by Shigu District to the northeast, Yanfeng District to the southeast, Hengnan County to the south and the west, Hengyang County to the north. The district has four subdistricts and two townships under its jurisdiction, the government seat is at Zhengxiang Subdistrict.

Administrative divisions
4 subdistricts
 Hongxiang
 Huaxing
 Lianhe
 Zhengxiang

2 towns
 Aiyingling
 Yumushan

References

External links
  www.xzqh.org 

County-level divisions of Hunan
Hengyang